Empire is a census-designated place (CDP) in Stanislaus County, California, United States.  The population was 4,189 at the 2010 census, up from 3,903 at the 2000 census. It is part of the Modesto Metropolitan Statistical Area. Influenced by the Mexican culture, Empire is agriculturally active, and is home to the new Empire Community Park.

History

In 1854, the town of Empire City was founded on the south bank of the
Tuolumne River, one mile south of present-day Empire. It was reputedly named after New York City, the "Empire City".  However, some sources indicate that the town was founded as early as 1850.  The town shows on the 1852 Gibbes map as Empire.  It is alleged to have been almost destroyed and deserted twice, in 1852 and 1855.  The town served as the head of navigation for steamboats on the Tuolumne River. Empire City became the county seat of Stanislaus County, and was flooded in the Great Flood of 1862. In 1896, the town relocated one mile north of the river, and was renamed Empire for the Santa Fe Railroad.  (Part of the San Francisco and San Joaquin Valley Railroad line which the Santa Fe acquired in 1898.)

Downtown
Downtown Empire is situated in the second town layout. It includes a small post office, a Church of the Brethren church, and the Empire Community Park with the Empire City Historic Landmark.

Geography
Empire is located at  (37.644298, -120.907592).

Climate
According to the Köppen climate classification system, Empire has a warm-summer Mediterranean climate, Csa on climate maps.

Demographics

2010
The 2010 United States Census reported that Empire had a population of 4,189. The racial makeup of Empire was 2,274 (54.3%) White, 22 (0.5%) African American, 56 (1.3%) Native American, 59 (1.4%) Asian, 8 (0.2%) Pacific Islander, 1,500 (35.8%) from other races, and 270 (6.4%) from two or more races. Hispanic or Latino of any race were 2,275 persons (54.3%).

The Census reported that 4,037 people (96.4% of the population) lived in households, 152 (3.6%) lived in non-institutionalized group quarters, and 0 (0%) were institutionalized.

There were 1,215 households, out of which 570 (46.9%) had children under the age of 18 living in them, 585 (48.1%) were opposite-sex married couples living together, 244 (20.1%) had a female householder with no husband present, 103 (8.5%) had a male householder with no wife present.  There were 98 (8.1%) unmarried opposite-sex partnerships, and 11 (0.9%) same-sex married couples or partnerships. 204 households (16.8%) were made up of individuals, and 71 (5.8%) had someone living alone who was 65 years of age or older. The average household size was 3.32.  There were 932 families (76.7% of all households); the average family size was 3.74.

The population was spread out, with 1,227 people (29.3%) under the age of 18, 428 people (10.2%) aged 18 to 24, 1,097 people (26.2%) aged 25 to 44, 1,024 people (24.4%) aged 45 to 64, and 413 people (9.9%) who were 65 years of age or older.  The median age was 32.8 years. For every 100 females, there were 100.7 males.  For every 100 females age 18 and over, there were 96.0 males.

The homeowner vacancy rate was 2.0%; the rental vacancy rate was 10.5%.  2,375 people (56.7% of the population) lived in owner-occupied housing units and 1,662 people (39.7%) lived in rental housing units.

2000
As of the census of 2000, there were 3,903 people, 1,160 households, and 881 families residing in the CDP. The racial makeup of the CDP was 65.92% White, 0.54% African American, 1.46% Native American, 1.82% Asian, 0.20% Pacific Islander, 24.62% from other races, and 5.43% from two or more races. Hispanic or Latino of any race were 42.89% of the population.

There were 1,160 households, out of which 39.0% had children under the age of 18 living with them, 52.6% were married couples living together, 16.3% had a female householder with no husband present, and 24.0% were non-families. 20.6% of all households were made up of individuals, and 9.1% had someone living alone who was 65 years of age or older.  The average household size was 3.30 and the average family size was 3.77.

In the CDP, the population was spread out, with 31.6% under the age of 18, 10.3% from 18 to 24, 27.4% from 25 to 44, 19.8% from 45 to 64, and 10.9% who were 65 years of age or older.  The median age was 32 years. For every 100 females, there were 95.5 males.  For every 100 females age 18 and over, there were 89.5 males.

The median income for a household in the CDP was $27,500, and the median income for a family was $30,862. Males had a median income of $28,814 versus $22,750 for females. The per capita income for the CDP was $12,133.  About 16.5% of families and 21.8% of the population were below the poverty line, including 25.1% of those under age 18 and 22.2% of those age 65 or over.

Government

The Empire Municipal Advisory Council is the town's council, along with the library, sheriff's office, and health center, it receives help from Stanislaus County.

References

Census-designated places in Stanislaus County, California
Census-designated places in California